The Last Ordeal is the third album by the Swedish melodic death metal band Hearse.

Track listing

2005 albums
Hearse (band) albums